Boiling Springs is a census-designated place (CDP) in Spartanburg County, South Carolina, United States. The population was 8,219 at the 2010 census.

Namesake
The area became known as Boiling Springs because of a small spring in its heart that, up until the land was commercially developed, actually appeared as if it were boiling and would sometimes shoot water  into the air. The geyser diminished gradually over the years. In the 1930s it had become a shallow, barely bubbling stream and today the water is still. The spring is located at the corner of McMillian Boulevard and Highway 9 on the same lot as the (formerly) Bi-Lo Shopping Center and the Verizon Mobile store. Once the land was developed and the shopping center was built, the springs ceased to boil. After the spring was cleaned up and dug out, a small park was built around it with benches, flags, and a memorial to a citizen of Boiling Springs.

Geography
Boiling Springs is located at  (35.043151, -81.975381).

Demographics

2020 census

As of the 2020 United States census, there were 10,405 people, 3,529 households, and 2,457 families residing in the CDP.

2000 census
As of the census of 2000, there were 4,544 people, 1,714 households, and 1,336 families residing in the CDP. The population density was 666.9 people per square mile (257.6/km2). There were 1,801 housing units at an average density of 264.3/sq mi (102.1/km2). The racial makeup of the CDP was 90.82% White, 6.34% African American, 0.24% Native American, 1.50% Asian, 0.51% from other races, and 0.59% from two or more races. Hispanic or Latino of any race were 1.21% of the population.

There were 1,714 households, out of which 38.4% had children under the age of 18 living with them, 65.1% were married couples living together, 9.4% had a female householder with no husband present, and 22.0% were non-families. 19.3% of all households were made up of individuals, and 7.2% had someone living alone who was 65 years of age or older. The average household size was 2.62 and the average family size was 3.00.

In the CDP, the population was spread out, with 26.1% under the age of 18, 7.3% from 18 to 24, 33.1% from 25 to 44, 22.5% from 45 to 64, and 10.9% who were 65 years of age or older. The median age was 35 years. For every 100 females, there were 93.4 males. For every 100 females age 18 and over, there were 91.1 males.

The median income for a household in the CDP was $65,640, and the median income for a family was $70,256. Males had a median income of $39,625 versus $33,279 for females. The per capita income for the CDP was $20,814. About 4.7% of families and 6.4% of the population were below the poverty line, including 7.7% of those under age 18 and 3.3% of those age 65 or over.

Education
Boiling Springs students are part of Spartanburg County School District 2. For the 2013-2014 Academic Year, Spartanburg District 2 was named the top school district in the State of South Carolina by the South Carolina Department of Education. 63% of educators in Spartanburg District 2 have a master's degree or higher, and 19% are National Board certified, placing the district in the top 1% of school districts nationwide.

Boiling Springs has a lending library, a branch of the Spartanburg County Public Library.

Sherman College of Chiropractic is outside of the CDP though it has a Boiling Springs postal address.

Notable people
William McGirt, professional golfer
Dylan Thompson, quarterback, University of South Carolina, San Francisco 49ers
Brooks Foster, wide receiver, University of North Carolina, St. Louis Rams

References

Census-designated places in Spartanburg County, South Carolina
Census-designated places in South Carolina